Thomas Cheseman or Baker (c. 1488–1536 or later) was an English politician.

He was a Member of Parliament (MP) of the Parliament of England for Rye in 1523.

References

1480s births
16th-century deaths
Politicians from Carlisle, Cumbria
English MPs 1523